Deconstructing Sammy is a book by author Matt Birkbeck about the life and death of Sammy Davis, Jr. and the subsequent efforts to restore his legacy. Published in September 2008 by Amistad/HarperCollins the book follows the efforts of a Pennsylvania lawyer and former Assistant U.S. Attorney, Albert "Sonny" Murray Jr., who was hired in 1994 by Sammy's poverty-stricken wife Altovise to help resolve Sammy's debts. Upon his death from cancer in 1990, Sammy Davis Jr. owed over $15 million, of which $7 million was owed to the Internal Revenue Service. Murray spent seven years representing the Davis estate, from 1994 to 2001, during which time he resolved the debts, restored Sammy's legacy and earned Sammy a posthumous Grammy Award in 2001. Deconstructing Sammy reveals Sammy Davis, Jr. as a brilliant yet tragic figure in American culture.

The New York Timesin a December 2008 review hailed the book was "Gripping" and "Sensational." The Los Angeles Times called Deconstructing Sammy "Epic" and "Tremendous" in a November 2008 review, while the Tennessee Tribune described the book as "stunning" in a November 2008 review.

The paperback version was published in September 2009.

References
https://deadline.com/2015/10/sammy-davis-jr-biography-movie-tv-documentary-byron-allen-1201596666/

2008 non-fiction books
Books about entertainers
Biographies about African-American people